Bobtail Mountain Provincial Park is a provincial park in British Columbia, Canada. It was established on June 29, 2000, under the Protected Areas of British Columbia Act.

References

External links

Provincial parks of British Columbia
2000 establishments in British Columbia